Bloodline is the thirty-first album by American singer/guitarist Glen Campbell, released in 1976 (see 1976 in music).

Track listing 
All tracks composed by Dennis Lambert and Brian Potter; except where indicated
Side 1:

 "Baby Don't Be Giving Me Up" – 3:31
 "See You on Sunday" – 3:35
 "Don't Pull Your Love/Then You Can Tell Me Goodbye" (John D. Loudermilk) – 3:22
 "Christiaan No" (Jimmy Webb) – 2:34
 "Bloodline" (Stephen Geyer) – 4:32

Side 2:

 "Everytime I Sing a Love Song" (Gloria Sklerov, Phyllis Molinary) – 3:09
 "Lay Me Down (Roll Me Out to Sea)" (Larry Weiss) – 4:12
 "The Bottom Line" – 3:35
 "I Got Love for You Ruby" (Sandy Linzer) – 3:37
 "San Francisco Is a Lonely Town" (Ben Peters) – 3:21

Personnel 
 Glen Campbell – vocals, acoustic guitar
 Dean Parks – electric guitar
 Ben Benay – electric guitar
 Fred Tackett – acoustic guitar
 Larry Carlton – electric guitar
 Joe Sidore – acoustic guitar
 Scott Edwards – bass guitar
 Lee Sklar – bass guitar
 Ed Greene – drums
 Dave Kemper – drums
 Billy Graham – fiddle
 Carl Jackson – banjo
 Dennis Lambert – keyboards, percussion
 Michael Omartian – keyboards
 Tom Sellers – keyboards
 Gary Coleman – percussion
 Paul Hubinon, Chuck Findley, Jim Horn, Tom Scott, Dick Hyde – horns
 Sid Sharp – concertmaster strings
 Ginger Baker, Julia Tillman Waters, Maxine Willard Waters, David Durham, Oren Waters, Michael Smotherman, Lisa Roberts, Glen Campbell – backing vocals

Production 
 Producers – Dennis Lambert, Brian Potter
 Arranger – Thomas Sellers
 Engineer – Joe Sidore
 Recorded by Ralph Osborn III
 Mastering Engineer – Mike Reese
 Production assistant – Marsha Lewis
 Rhythm arranged by Michael Omartian on "Don't Pull Your Love/Then You Can Tell Me Goodbye", "Lay Me Down (Roll Me Out To Sea)" and "Bloodline"

Charts 
Album – Billboard (United States)

Singles – Billboard (United States)

References 
 
 
 
 

Glen Campbell albums
1976 albums
Capitol Records albums